Haitian may refer to:

Relating to Haiti
 Haitian, an adjective referring to something of, from, or related to Haiti
 Haitian Creole, a French-Creole based
 Haitian French, variant of the French language
 Haitians, an ethnic group
 Haitian art
 Haitian Carnival
 Haitian cuisine, traditional foods
 Haitian gourde, a unit of currency
 Haitian patty, in culinary contexts
 Haitian literature
 Haitian mythology
 Haitian Revolution
 Haitian Vodou
 Ligue Haïtienne (Haitian League)

Other uses
 Haitian (Heroes), minor character in the 2006 television series Heroes

See also 
 Haitian−Qingdao railway, a railway in Shandong Province, China
 
 

Language and nationality disambiguation pages